Shah Kola-ye Said Kashi (also Romanized as Shāh Kolā-ye Saʿīd Kāshī) is a village in Balatajan Rural District, in the Central District of Qaem Shahr County, Mazandaran Province, Iran. At the 2006 census, its population was 77, in 24 families.

References 

Populated places in Qaem Shahr County